Poondi Arugar Temple is a Jain temple which located  from Arani, Tiruvannamalai district, Tamil Nadu, India. The temple was built by Cholas. It is one of the protected monuments in Tamil Nadu declared by Archaeological Survey of India.

References 

Jain temples in Tamil Nadu